Diphlorethol is a phlorotannin found in the brown alga Cystophora retroflexa. It falls under the phlorethols class of phlorotannins due to the ether bond that connects its two phloroglucinol units.

References 

Phlorotannin dimers